Warwick Township is one of the twenty-two townships of Tuscarawas County, Ohio, United States.  The 2000 census found 2,746 people in the township, 1,788 of whom lived in the unincorporated portions of the township.

Geography
Located in the east central part of the county, it borders the following townships:
Goshen Township - north
Mill Township - east
Rush Township - south
Clay Township - southwest
York Township - northwest

Several populated places are located in Warwick Township:
Tuscarawas, a village in the center
Wainwright, an unincorporated community in the north
Part of Gnadenhutten, a village in the south

Name and history
Warwick Township was established April 1, 1819. It is the only Warwick Township statewide.

Government
The township is governed by a three-member board of trustees, who are elected in November of odd-numbered years to a four-year term beginning on the following January 1. Two are elected in the year after the presidential election and one is elected in the year before it. There is also an elected township fiscal officer, who serves a four-year term beginning on April 1 of the year after the election, which is held in November of the year before the presidential election. Vacancies in the fiscal officership or on the board of trustees are filled by the remaining trustees.  The current trustees are Robert Briggs, Belle Everett, and Keith Pretorius, and the fiscal officer is Susan Robson.

References

External links
County website

Townships in Tuscarawas County, Ohio
Townships in Ohio